Bill Mayman (1 May 1887 – 20 April 1970) was an Australian rules footballer who played with Sturt in the South Australian Football League (SAFL).

A centreman or half-back flanker, Mayman began his career at Mines Rovers in the Goldfields Football Association. In 1913, he joined Sturt in the South Australian Football League, and became captain in 1914. He led the club to its first and second premierships in 1915 and 1919. In 1922, he moved to Tasmania and joined the New Town Football Club, playing there for three years.

Mayman represented three different states at carnival football, representing Western Australia in 1911, captaining South Australia in 1914, and represented Tasmania in 1924.

He is the great-granduncle of Australian rules footballers Bradley Crouch, who plays for the St Kilda Football Club, and his younger brother and former teammate Matt Crouch, who plays for the Adelaide Football Club in the Australian Football League (AFL).

Notes

External links 
Bill Mayman's profile at AustralianFootball.com
Bill Mayman photo at State Library of South Australia

1887 births
1970 deaths
Sturt Football Club players
Glenorchy Football Club players
Australian rules footballers from Western Australia
South Australian Football Hall of Fame inductees
Burnie Football Club players
Boulder City Football Club players
Australian rules footballers from Melbourne
People from Footscray, Victoria